Sosruko, Sosruquo, or Sosriqwa (Soslan; , Sosryqwa; , Sosuruq/Sosurqa) is a central character in many cycles of the Nart sagas of the Caucasus.

Sosruko is a powerful but devious man who is the smallest of the Narts; as a character, he is sometimes cast in the light of the trickster god, comparable to the Scandinavian Loki (who finds a closer parallel in the Nart Syrdon, however), Georgian Amirani, or the Ancient Greek Prometheus. It is possible that at least in the latter case, Sosruku served as a direct inspiration.

In Circassian mythology, it was the Nart Sosriqwe, minion of the gods and his doting mother, Lady Satanaya, who stole fire from the giant.

Etymology 
One folk etymology states that Sosruko [] is from Circassian  "sword" +  "hit" +  "heat" +  "son"; hence literally “The son of the fiery sword hit”.
 
In Ossetian, the name Soslan etymologically came from Turkic languages: Nogai suslan- "to look menacing", suslä "menacing, gloomy" (hence ). Another plausible etymology is that the Ossetic term "Sozyr" in the regional variant "Sozyryqo" is cognate with the Persian "Sezavar", meaning "He who is worthy", with the Suffix being of exogenous origin, this would explain why in the notably conservative Digor-Ossetic dialect, the name Sosruko is preferred over the Turkic name Soslan, and why the name "Sozyr" without the suffix, is so common among Digor-Ossetian elders.

References

External links 
 Nart Tales of the Circassians - Reocities personal page
 The Circassian Nart Epos - International Centre for Circassian Studies

Trickster gods
Caucasus
Circassians
Circassian mythology
Ossetian mythology
Mythological characters